Václav Rabas (1933 in Dolní Bezděkov, Czechoslovakia – 2015 in Pardubice, Czech Republic) was a Czech organist and music teacher.

Rabas graduated from the Prague Conservatory and from the Faculty of Music of the Academy of Performing Arts in Prague (prof. Jiří Rheinberger). He won the first prize in the Prague Spring International Organ Competition. He records for Czech Radio and Czech Television. He was a Professor of the Faculty of Music of the Academy of Performing Arts in Prague and Conservatory in Pardubice (his students: Aleš Bárta, Pavel Svoboda etc.). He premiered some organ works of Petr Eben, Miloslav Kabeláč, Luboš Sluka, Klement Slavický etc.

References

External links
Biography (Czech)

Czech classical organists
People from Chrudim District
Male classical organists
2015 deaths
1933 births
Academy of Performing Arts in Prague alumni
Prague Conservatory alumni
20th-century classical musicians
20th-century Czech male musicians